Siba Sheikh Khidir (also Jazira or Jazeera) is a village located in the Sinjar District of the Ninawa Governorate in Iraq. The village is located south of the Sinjar Mount. It belongs to the disputed territories of Northern Iraq. Siba Sheikh Khidir is populated by Yazidis and was one of two villages targeted in the 2007 Yazidi communities bombings against the local Yazidi community.

See also 
 Til Ezer
 Genocide of Yazidis by ISIL
 Sinjar massacre

References 

Nineveh Governorate
Yazidi populated places in Iraq